Josephine Nabukenya is a Ugandan HIV/AIDS activist who is also living with HIV/AIDS. She serves as a Stephen Lewis Foundation Youth program coordinator at Makerere University Johns Hopkins University (MUJHU). She was awarded the Queen’s Young Leader Award in 2016 for her advocacy work. She is also an Ambassador at Elizabeth Glaser Pediatric AIDS Foundation (EGPAF)'s Ariel Club.  She is one of the young leaders who grew from being timid to a resilient and powerful young leader who encourages other children to live positively and take their pills.

Background life 
Josephine Nabukenya lived with HIV from childhood but was not  aware of her HIV status until she was eight years old when she came across a letter written by her mother that revealed to her the truth. Herself including her mother, father, and younger sister are all having HIV however both Josephine and her sister got infected at birth. When she made her health status public, she began seeking treatment. Josephine was introduced to the Elizabeth Glaser Pediatric AIDS Foundation’s Ariel Club shortly when she had begun an antiretroviral therapy at a local hospital. She later became an Ariel Club facilitator, leading sessions to help other children accept their own HIV status and seek the treatment they needed to stay healthy.  During her time  at Ariel, she used her story to help guide others to overcome the challenges of a life with HIV. She also used her confidence in the promise of her own life which grew stronger. As of today Josephine has continued to speak out as an Ambassador for EGPAF through her work with Ariel Clubs in Uganda to speak in front of members of the U.S. Congress. Her story continues to inspires other people to learn about HIV and fight the stigma and discrimination around the disease.

Josephine Nabukenya watched her mother, Margaret Lubega, battle with illness and she decided one day to go to Mulago National Referral Hospital where she asked to be tested.  Although, she was too young to realise what was taking place and only recalls going to Mulago National Referral Hospital and playing with children she found there as they shared cake and soft drinks.

She started Young General Alive (YGA), an organisation that initially constituted Lubega, another mother and her child and another patient they had met at Mulago hospital during a visit. In 2005, Makerere University - Johns Hopkins University Research Collaboration (Mujhu) helped them to formalise their group.

Education 
She is a degree holder in Social Work from Makerere University in Uganda.

Career life 
In 2005, under EGPAF, she represented children both infected and affected by HIV/aids in the US congress.

See also 

 Queen's Young Leader Award
 Stephen Lewis Foundation
 Johns Hopkins University
 Elizabeth Glaser Pediatric AIDS Foundation
 Makerere University

References

External links 
Power Talks on YouTube by Josephine Nabukenya.
Beyond Your Status: Thriving in Life in Spite of HIV Kindle Edition
https://www.youtube.com/watch?v=E0Y4MgWm4MY
Josephine Nabukenya, dedicated campaigner for young people with HIV

Year of birth missing (living people)
Ugandan women journalists
Makerere University alumni
HIV/AIDS activists
HIV/AIDS in Uganda
Living people
Ugandan women activists